Jan Cornet Galí (born February 24, 1982) is a Spanish actor. He won a Goya Award for his role as Vicente in Pedro Almodóvar's The Skin I Live In (2012).

Filmography

References

External links

1982 births
Spanish film actors
Living people
21st-century Spanish male actors
Method actors